Szelejewo  is a village in the administrative district of Gmina Gąsawa, within Żnin County, Kuyavian-Pomeranian Voivodeship, in north-central Poland.

People 
 Ferdinand von Kummer (1816-1900), German general

References

Szelejewo